Jonathan Meunier (born August 4, 1987) is a Canadian professional mixed martial artist who competes in the welterweight division. A professional mixed martial artist since 2013, Meunier has also competed in the Ultimate Fighting Championship.

Background
Meunier was born in Quebec City, Quebec, Canada and started Taekwondo at an early age and later trained in kickboxing.  He holds multiple titles in both kickboxing and MMA (amateur and pro).

He trains at Tristar Gym where his follow teammates are Alex Garcia, Georges St-Pierre and Rory MacDonald in Montréal.

Mixed martial arts career

Early career
Meunier made his professional MMA debut on October 5, 2013 at Quebec Mixed martial Arts League 1 in Canada, and amassed an undefeated record of 7-0 with all finishes prior to being signed by the UFC.

Ultimate Fighting Championship
Meunier made his UFC debut against Colby Covington on short notice, replacing his Tristar teammate Alex Garcia on June 18, 2016 at UFC Fight Night: MacDonald vs. Thompson in Ottawa, Canada. He lost the fight via submission in round three.

He next faced Richard Walsh on November 27, 2016 at UFC Fight Night: Whittaker vs. Brunson. He won the fight via unanimous decision with the scoreboard of 29-28, 30-27 and 30-27.

He was expected to face Li Jingliang on June 17, 2017 in Singapore at UFC Fight Night: Holm vs. Correia. He was pulled from the fight due to injury and was replaced by Frank Camacho.

New UFC ownership group Endeavor has taken a close look at the contractual practices of the organizations and has made several changes. The change that impacted the decision regarding Meunier had to do with precautionary measures. The UFC felt that a lack of data surrounding the conditions in Meunier’s medical history made them unable to secure his safety.

UFC released Meunier in February 2018 citing medical concerns of his brain injury.

Post-UFC career
Meunier joined TKO MMA not long late his termination from UFC, making his promotional debut against Menad Abella at TKO 43 on May 4, 2018. He won the fight via unanimous decision.

Next Meunier faced Nassourdine Imavov at ARES FC 1 on December 14, 2019. He lost the fight via technical knockout in the first round.

Championships and accomplishments

Battlefield Fight League 

Battlefield Fight League amateur middleweight kickboxing champion

Personal life 
Meunier's idol is Anderson Silva whose nick name is "Spider", and as Meunier is a French Canadian, hence his nickname, "The French Spider." His earlier nick name "District" was named after his shop in Quebec City.

Mixed martial arts record

|-
|Loss
|align=center| 9–2
|Nassourdine Imavov
|TKO (punches)
|ARES FC 1
| 
|align=center|1
|align=center|4:27
|Dakar, Senegal
|
|-
|Win
|align=center| 9–1
|Menad Abella
|Decision (unanimous)
|TKO 43 - Barriault vs. Kornberger
| 
|align=center|3
|align=center|5:00
|Quebec City, Canada
|
|-
|Win
|align=center| 8–1
|Richard Walsh
|Decision (unanimous)
|UFC Fight Night: Whittaker vs. Brunson
| 
|align=center|3
|align=center|5:00
|Melbourne, Australia
|
|-
|Loss
|align=center| 7–1
|Colby Covington
|Submission (rear-naked choke)
|UFC Fight Night: MacDonald vs. Thompson
| 
|align=center|3
|align=center|0:54
|Ottawa, Canada
|
|-
|Win
|align=center| 7–0
|Francis Charbonneau
|Submission (rear-naked choke)
|Quebec Mixed Martial Arts League 5
| 
|align=center|1
|align=center|3:59
|Quebec City, Canada
|
|-
|Win
|align=center| 6–0
|Stephen Martinez
|TKO (elbows) 
|Z Promotions: Fight Night Medicine Hat
| 
|align=center|1
|align=center|4:04
|Medicine Hat, Alberta, Canada
|
|-
|Win
|align=center| 5–0
|Loyd Galindo
|Submission (triangle choke)
|Quebec Mixed Martial Arts League 4
| 
|align=center|2
|align=center|4:05
|Quebec City, Canada
|
|-
|Win
|align=center| 4–0
|Yannis Jacquet
|TKO (knees and punches)
|Fight4Pride Championship 3
| 
|align=center|1
|align=center|N/A
|Laval, Quebec, Canada
|
|-
|Win
|align=center| 3–0
|Dave Leduc
|TKO (punches)
|Hybrid Combat: Hybrid Pro Series 2
| 
|align=center|1
|algign=center|3:36
|Gatineau, Quebec, Canada
|
|-
|Win
|align=center| 2–0
|David Hubert Therrien
|TKO (punches)
|Quebec Mixed Martial Arts League 2
| 
|align=center|1
|align=center|3:19
|Quebec City, Canada
|
|-
|Win
|align=center| 1–0
|Bruno-Pierre Duboi
|TKO (punches)
|Quebec Mixed Martial Arts League 1
| 
|align=center|1
|align=center|4:29
|Quebec City, Canada
|
|-

See also
 List of current UFC fighters
 List of male mixed martial artists
 List of Canadian UFC fighters

References

External links

1987 births
Living people
Welterweight mixed martial artists
Canadian male mixed martial artists
Mixed martial artists utilizing kickboxing 
Mixed martial artists utilizing Brazilian jiu-jitsu 
Sportspeople from Quebec City
Ultimate Fighting Championship male fighters
Canadian practitioners of Brazilian jiu-jitsu